Jerame Dean Tuman (born March 24, 1976) is a former American football tight end. He was drafted by the Pittsburgh Steelers in the fifth round of the 1999 NFL Draft. He won Super Bowl XL with the Steelers, defeating the Seattle Seahawks. He played college football at Michigan.

He also has played for the Arizona Cardinals of the National Football League (NFL).

Early years
Tuman played both tight end and defensive end at Liberal High School. He was a Prep Football Report All-America and All-Midlands selection and rated the fifth-best tight end prospect in the nation by Blue Chip Illustrated. He also earned a state championship during his junior year. Tuman also lettered in track while competing in the discus, triple jump and sprint relays.

College career
Tuman played college football for the University of Michigan, playing tight end. He joined the team in 1995, and graduated after the 1998 season, earning First-team All-Big Ten honors in 1996, 1997, and 1998.  He was also named an All-American by several news outlets in 1997.

Tuman was the starting tight end for the 1997 undefeated team named National Champions by the Associated Press, and scored the decisive touchdown in the 1998 Rose Bowl victory over Washington State which secured their undefeated season.

During his time at Michigan, Tuman was part of an offensive bread and butter play with quarterback Brian Griese, in which Griese rolled out on a play-action bootleg to find an open Tuman.  The play was run successfully throughout the 1997 season, including 4 times against Colorado and for a go-ahead score in the 1998 Rose Bowl.

Professional career

Pittsburgh Steelers
He was selected with the third pick of the fifth round of the 1999 NFL Draft by the Pittsburgh Steelers. He spent 9 years with the Steelers, primarily as the second-string tight end. Most of his playing time was during two tight end sets and on special teams. On February 22, 2008, he was released by the Steelers.

Arizona Cardinals
On March 3, 2008 the Arizona Cardinals signed Tuman to a two-year contract. Ken Whisenhunt, the head coach of the Cardinals, had previously served as tight ends coach and offensive coordinator for the Steelers during Tuman's time with the team.

Tuman was released by the Cardinals on December 24 after the team signed linebacker Victor Hobson. Tuman had appeared in three games for the Cardinals including two starts, catching three passes for 41 yards. On January 13, the Cardinals re-signed Tuman during the playoffs after tight end Stephen Spach was placed on injured reserve with a torn ACL.

Personal
Jerame is married to Molly Tuman, sister of Tuman's former college teammate at Michigan, Scott Dreisbach. They have four children: one son, Canyon, and three daughters, Avery, Makenna and Mia.

He shares birthdays with Denver Broncos quarterback Peyton Manning and former NFL quarterback Aaron Brooks.

In 2017, Tuman served as an assistant football coach at North Allegheny Senior High School in Wexford, Pennsylvania.

See also
Lists of Michigan Wolverines football receiving leaders

References

1976 births
American football tight ends
Arizona Cardinals players
Living people
Michigan Wolverines football players
People from Liberal, Kansas
Pittsburgh Steelers players
Players of American football from Kansas